Piotr Jarosiewicz (born 28 June 1998) is a Polish handball player for KS Azoty-Puławy and the Polish national team.

He represented Poland at the 2020 European Men's Handball Championship.

References

External links

1998 births
Living people
People from Lębork
Polish male handball players
21st-century Polish people